Oleksandr Hryhorovych Kiryukhin (born 1 October 1974) is a retired Ukrainian professional footballer.

Honours
 Ukrainian Premier League champion: 1998, 1999, 2000.

European club competitions
 1998–99 UEFA Champions League with FC Dynamo Kyiv: 4 games.
 2001–02 UEFA Cup with FC Chernomorets Novorossiysk: 1 game.

References

External links
 

1974 births
Living people
People from Nikopol, Ukraine
Soviet footballers
Ukrainian footballers
Ukrainian expatriate footballers
Ukraine international footballers
Ukrainian Premier League players
Russian Premier League players
FC Elektrometalurh-NZF Nikopol players
FC Zorya Luhansk players
FC Elista players
FC Dynamo Kyiv players
PFC Krylia Sovetov Samara players
FC Kryvbas Kryvyi Rih players
FC Chernomorets Novorossiysk players
FC Borysfen Boryspil players
Expatriate footballers in Russia
FC SKA-Khabarovsk players
Association football defenders
FC Dynamo Saint Petersburg players
Sportspeople from Dnipropetrovsk Oblast